Benjamín Edu Ndong Ndoho (born 13 March 1999), or simply Benjamín, is an Equatoguinean footballer who plays as a forward for Spanish Primera Autonómica Preferente de Castilla-La Mancha club UD La Fuente and for the Equatorial Guinea national team.

Club career
Born in Ebibeyin, Benjamín has played for Rio Ave FC in Portugal. He is a product of Cano Sport Academy.

International career
Benjamín made his international debut for Equatorial Guinea in 2017.

References

External links

1999 births
Living people
People from Ebibeyin
Equatoguinean footballers
Association football forwards
Cano Sport Academy players
Rio Ave F.C. players
Equatorial Guinea international footballers
Equatoguinean expatriate footballers
Equatoguinean expatriate sportspeople in Portugal
Expatriate footballers in Portugal
Equatoguinean expatriate sportspeople in Spain
Expatriate footballers in Spain